UMshwathi Local Municipality is situated in UMgungundlovu District Municipality (UMDM) which is in the foothills of the province of KwaZulu-Natal, about 120 km northwest  of Durban, geographically located between the N2 and the N3 highways. The municipality is the largest Municipality in the largest district of KZN out of the seven Local Municipalities which form UMDM.

The Municipality is advantageously situated between the major ports of Durban and Richards Bay and 90 km (along the R614) and 145 km (along the N3) from King Shaka International Airport and Dube Trade Port Company (DTPC). The Mdloti River headspring, Hazelmere Dam, Mvoti River are the primary water source for the North Coast and, are situated in uMshwathi. The Albert Falls and Nagle Dams are located partly within the Municipal boundaries.

The Municipality was created after the merger of previous Transitional Local Councils and Tribal Areas administered by the former Development Services Board. The area has four major urban centres in the area with a fifty emerging business hubs of Bhamshela. New Hanover is the administrative hub; four major rural residential settlements in the UMshwathi district have fourteen wards. The Municipality has 27 councillors, and the Ward Committees work in each ward to pro-mote civic involvement in local affairs.

The Municipality covers 1 811 square kilometres and has an estimated population of 111 645 people as reported in the 2016 community survey.  It is the second most populous Local Municipality within uMgungundlovu District Municipality. On the National level, uMshwathi rank position 105 in terms of population.  uMsunduzi is the most populous Municipality within the district with 679 038 people (community survey 2016). The Municipality was established in 2001 by amalgamating the Transitional Local Council (TLC) that existed before that period. .

Main places
The 2001 census divided the municipality into the following main places:

Politics 

The municipal council consists of twenty-seven members elected by mixed-member proportional representation. Fourteen councillors are elected by first-past-the-post voting in fourteen wards, while the remaining thirteen are chosen from party lists so that the total number of party representatives is proportional to the number of votes received. In the election of 1 November 2021 the African National Congress (ANC) won a majority of sixteen seats on the council.

The following table shows the results of the election.

References

External links
 http://www.umshwathi.gov.za/

Local municipalities of the Umgungundlovu District Municipality